Anthony Hayward (born 1959) is a British journalist and author.

Anthony Hayward may also refer to:

 Anthony W. B. Hayward, British corporate executive and founder of the Haywards 5000 beer brand
 Tony Hayward, British businessman